Kamanin is a Russian masculine surname originating from a slang word kamanitsya meaning to swagger. Its feminine counterpart is Kamanina. It may refer to
Alexey Kamanin (born 1978), Russian handball player
Nikolai Kamanin (1908–1982), Soviet aviator

References

Russian-language surnames